Pont-l'Évêque may refer to:

Places in France
 Pont-l'Évêque, Calvados, in the Calvados department, Normandy
 Canton of Pont-l'Évêque, the surrounding canton
 Pont-l'Évêque, Oise, in the Oise department, Picardy

Other uses
 Pont-l'Évêque cheese, named after the commune in Normandy
 Pont l'Eveque (horse), winner of the 1940 English Derby
 Roger de Pont L'Évêque, 12th-century Archbishop of York

See also
 Pont-Évêque, Isère, France